Vučji Do is a settlement in the municipality of Nikšić, Montenegro.

Geography
Vučji Do is located near the Montenegro–Bosnia border,  6 km east from Bileća.

History
 

In the early modern period, the region was part of the Nikšić tribe. Vučji Do was the site of the Battle of Vučji Do (18 July 1876), in which Montenegrin and Herzegovinian battalions defeated the Ottoman army.

Demographics
According to the 2003 census, the total population was 30, 29 of whom were Serbs (96,66%), 1 was Montenegrin (3,33%).

According to the 2011 census, its population was only 22, 18 of them Serbs.

References

Populated places in Nikšić Municipality
Serb communities in Montenegro